Tiruvirkolam (also Thiruvirkolam or Koovam or Coovum or Cooum) is an ancient temple town on the banks of the Koovam River in Tamil Nadu, India. It is located about 70 km from Chennai. The water, though sparkling clear over here, becomes polluted on the way and reaches the Bay of Bengal.

Landmarks
Sri Tripuranthaka Swami temple has God Murugan as the deity.

References

Cities and towns in Tiruvallur district